Männerchor or Maennerchor ("men's chorus") is the name given to German social clubs, primarily in the northeastern United States, Pennsylvania in particular.  The earliest forms of these clubs where "singing societies" that perpetuated traditional choral music, both German and German-American culture, providing Gemuetlichkeit for new immigrants.  Such clubs are typically attended by men and many function as a restaurant and bar, serving German foods and beers.

The Teutonia Männerchor was chartered in 1854 in Deutschtown, East Allegheny, on the north side of Pittsburgh. They have been at their current location since 1888, which is registered as a historic landmark. A Maennerchor was established in Cincinnati in 1857 with the merging of the Liedertafel, the Saengerbund, and the Germanic Societies; it was the oldest musical organization of the city. The Indianapolis Maennerchor. founded in 1854 in Indianapolis, Indiana, is another such organization.

The Damenchor often serves as the Maennerchor auxiliary for women.

List by state and city
Germania Männerchor, Chicago, Illinois
Germania Männerchor Volksfest, Evansville, Indiana
Indianapolis Maennerchor, Indianapolis, Indiana
Kenyon College Männerchor, Gambier, Ohio
Cleveland Maennerchor, Cleveland, Ohio
Youngstown Maennerchor, Youngstown, Ohio
Columbus Maennerchor, Columbus, Ohio
Portsmouth Maennerchor, Portsmouth, Ohio
Doylestown Maennerchor, Doylestown, Pennsylvania
Concordia Maennechor, Easton, Pennsylvania
Erie Maennerchor, Erie, Pennsylvania
Harrisburg Maennerchor, Harrisburg, Pennsylvania
Norristown Maennerchor, Norristown, Pennsylvania
Teutonia Maennerchor, Pittsburgh, Pennsylvania
West Coplay Maennerchor, Coplay, Pennsylvania
Houston Saengerbund, Houston, Texas
Madison Männerchor, Madison, Wisconsin

See also
Sängerfest
Nord-Amerikanischer Sängerbund

References

External links
Columbus Maennerchor
Teutonia Männerchor in (Deutschtown) Pittsburgh, Pennsylvania
Der Maennerchor in Harrisburg, Pennsylvania
Norristown Maennerchor in Norristown, Pennsylvania
West Coplay Maennerchor in Coplay, Pennsylvania

Clubs and societies in Germany 
Clubs and societies in the United States 
German-American culture
German-American history